The nasal foramina are foramina which run through the nasal bones.

References

External links
 http://zemlin.shs.uiuc.edu/Skull/slide-Pages/27.htm

Foramina of the skull